Naft Al-Wasat Sports Club is an Iraqi sports club based in Najaf, Iraq. Its professional football team plays in the Iraqi Premier League, the top tier of Iraqi football. The club's home stadium is An-Najaf Stadium.

Founded in 2008, Naft Al-Wasat spent three seasons in the Iraq Division Two and another three in the Iraq Division One until they were promoted from the 2013–14 Iraq Division One to the Iraqi Premier League. In their first season in the Iraqi Premier League, Naft Al-Wasat became the champions by achieving the 2014–15 Iraqi Premier League.

Their futsal club has participated in the AFC Futsal Club Championship.

History 
Naft Al-Wasat SC was found on 1 July 2008 by the Ministry of Oil. The founding board consisted of Riyadh Bahr Al-Ouloom, Abbas Fakhruddin, Firas Nouri, Haitham Abbas, Ali Juwad, Yasin Khudhair, Mustafa Mohammed, Hassan Juwad, Wisam Fawzi and Basim Radhi. The club entered the Iraq Division Two and was promoted to the Iraq Division One in the 2010–11 season. In the 2011–12 season, Naft Al-Wasat made their first transfer from other clubs, signing Karrar Abd from Kufa FC in January 2012. In the 2011–12 season, Naft Al-Wasat barely qualified to the second stage, after having 8 wins, 6 draws and 4 losses, only a point away from Kufa FC. In the second stage, Naft Al-Wasat finished in 4th place of the Group 2, at 12 points, after having 4 wins and 4 losses, ending their first season in the Division One with failure.

In the 2012–13 season, Naft Al-Wasat failed again to qualify. In the groups stage, they became in top of Group D, at 27 points, being won 7 matches, drawn in 5 and lost only one. In the second stage they had a big breakdown, finishing in 5th place in Group 2, after winning only one match, drawing in 5 and losing 3. In the 2012–13 Iraq FA Cup, they reached the third round before being eliminated. In the first round, they defeated Samawa 4–0, and in the second round they eliminated Al-Sinaat Al-Kahrabaiya by beating them 4–3 on aggregate (the first leg was 1–1 and the second leg was 3–2). In the third round, they lost the first leg to Masafi Al-Wasat 2–1 and drew the second leg 2–2, being knocked out 4–3 on aggregate.

After the 2012–13 season, the technical staff was changed, signing the manager, Abdul Ghani Shahad, on 27 August 2013. In the 2013–14 season, Naft Al-Wasat were promoted for the first time in their history. They were in top of Group E at 34 points, 8 points away from Al-Diwaniya FC, which was a big difference from last seasons. In the second stage, Naft Al-Wasat took the Group 4 lead, at 20 points, by winning 6 matches and drawing in two. They ended their season as the leaders of Group 1 in the last stage, claiming promotion to the Iraqi Premier League.

After the end of the 2013–14 season, the club made major changes to get ready for the 2014–15 Iraqi Premier League with the total of 8 players signed, but the most important signing was Noor Sabri. Naft Al-Wasat were one of the teams that weren't expected to qualify to the second stage. Despite losing a third of their games in the first stage, finishing in 4th position out of ten teams in their group, Naft Al-Wasat just about managed to qualify for the final stage, after wins against the likes of Erbil and Al-Zawraa; this itself was considered a big success for the young team. In the second stage, the team surprised everyone by defeating Al Shorta SC (the defending champions and one of the strongest contenders for the league championship) twice. After taking the Group 1 lead, Naft Al-Wasat got qualified to the league final, where they won over Al-Quwa Al-Jawiya via a penalty shoot-out.

Their league title win qualified them for the 2016 AFC Cup. They finished top of Group B with a record of five wins and one loss, but they lost 1–0 in the round of 16 to Al-Jaish. They were not allowed to play their home matches in Iraq in this tournament due to security concerns. In the 2015–16 Iraqi Premier League, Naft Al-Wasat finished in second place in their group, behind eventual champions Al-Zawraa, to qualify for the final stage. In the final stage, Naft Al-Wasat finished as runners-up, again behind Al-Zawraa. As the league's runners-up, Naft Al-Wasat qualified for the 2016–17 Arab Club Championship, where they got revenge on Al-Jaish by knocking them out to qualify for the group stage.

Records 
After achieving the 2014–15 Iraqi Premier League, Naft Al-Wasat became the second team to be crowned as the Iraqi Premier League champions in their first season, the other being Al-Zawra'a in the 1975–76 season. Naft Al-Wasat are also the first team from Najaf to achieve the league and the fifth team that isn't from Baghdad to achieve it since its start in 1974. When the final match of the 2014–15 season, between Naft Al-Wasat and Al-Quwa Al-Jawiya, ended in a 6–5 win for Naft Al-Wasat via a penalty shoot-out, Noor Sabri remained undefeated in every penalty shoot-out throughout his career since 1999.

Statistics 
The season-by-season performance of the club over the recent years:

.
Rank = Rank in the league; P = Played; W = Win; D = Draw; L = Loss; F = Goals for; A = Goals against; GD = Goal difference; Pts = Points; Cup = Iraq FA Cup.
in = Still in competition; — = Not attended; 1R = 1st round; 2R = 2nd round; 3R = 3rd round; R16 = Round of sixteen; QF = Quarterfinals; SF = Semifinals.

1 The league was not completed and was cancelled.
2 Naft Al-Wasat had not yet been eliminated from the cup but it was abandoned midway through.

Current squad

First-team squad

Current technical staff
{| class="toccolours"
!bgcolor=silver|Position
!bgcolor=silver|Name
!bgcolor=silver|Nationality
|- bgcolor=#eeeeee
|Manager:||Abdul-Ghani Shahad||
|- 
|Assistant manager:||Haidar Najim||
|- bgcolor=#eeeeee
|Assistant manager:||Hassan Hadi||
|-
|Goalkeeping coach:||Hadi Jaber||
|-
| Fitness coach:||Majid Abdul-Hameed||
|-bgcolor=#eeeeee
|Technical and Statistical Analyst:||Moayed Ibrahim||
|-
|U-19 Manager:||Hassan Jawad||
|- 
| Director of football:||Nabeel Abbas||
|- 
| Administrative director:||Firas Bahrul-Oloom||
|-

Managerial history

  Abdul Ghani Shahad 
  Hamza El-Gamal 
  Thair Ahmed 
  Adel Nima 
  Emad Mohammed 
  Majed Najem 
  Radhi Shenaishil 
  Jamal Ali 
  Abdul Ghani Shahad

Honours

Domestic 
Iraqi Premier League (top tier)
Winner (1): 2014–15
Runners-up (1): 2015–16
Iraq Division One (second tier)
Winner (1): 2013–14 (shared)
Iraq FA Cup
Runners-up (1): 2016–17

Performance in continental competitions
AFC Cup: 1 appearance
2016: Round of 16
Arab Club Champions Cup: 1 appearance
2017: Group stage

References

External links 
 Club page on Goalzz

2008 establishments in Iraq
Football clubs in Najaf
Najaf